JunHe LLP, formerly Jun He Law Offices is a corporate law firm headquartered in Beijing, China. JunHe is one of the first private Chinese law firms.

As of 2022, JunHe has eleven offices: in Beijing (head office), Shanghai, Shenzhen, Guangzhou, Dalian, Haikou, Chengdu, Qingdao, Hangzhou, Hong Kong, New York, and Cupertino. The firm's working languages are Chinese, English, Korean, and Japanese. 

JunHe is a member of Multilaw and Lex Mundi.

Rankings 
JunHe was recommended by the 2010 edition of the IFLR1000, a guide to the world's leading financial law firms, in the following areas:

Clients 
The firm's major clients as of 2008 include(d) Citigroup, UBS, JPMorgan Chase, Deutsche Bank, Morgan Stanley, Ferrero, Motorola, Nokia, IKEA, BHP, Walmart, Nissan, Northwest Airlines, and ExxonMobil, as well as a number of local Chinese companies.

References

External links
JunHe homepage

See also 
Legal history of China
Chinese law

Law firms of China 
Law firms established in 1989
Foreign law firms with offices in Hong Kong